Gothic or Gothics may refer to:

People and languages
Goths or Gothic people, the ethnonym of a group of East Germanic tribes
Gothic language, an extinct East Germanic language spoken by the Goths
Crimean Gothic, the Gothic language spoken by the Crimean Goths, also extinct
Gothic alphabet, one of the alphabets used to write the Gothic language
Gothic (Unicode block), a collection of Unicode characters of the Gothic alphabet

Art and architecture
Gothic art, a Medieval art movement
Gothic architecture
Gothic Revival architecture (Neo-Gothic)
Carpenter Gothic
Collegiate Gothic
High Victorian Gothic

Romanticism
Gothic fiction or Gothic Romanticism, a literary genre

Entertainment
Gothic (film), a 1986 film by Ken Russell
Gothic (series), a video game series originally developed by Piranha Bytes Game Studios
Gothic (video game), a 2001 video game developed by Piranha Bytes Game Studios
Gothic (upcoming video game), an upcoming remake in development at Alkimia Interactive

Modern culture and lifestyle
Goth subculture, a music-cultural scene

Music
Gothic rock, a genre of rock music
Gothic metal, a genre of heavy metal music
Symphony No. 1 "The Gothic" (Brian), a symphony by Havergal Brian
Gothic (Paradise Lost album), 1991
Gothic (Nox Arcana album), 2015

Typography
 Blackletter, Gothic or Textura typefaces, a script historically used throughout Western Europe, resembling mediaeval scribal writing
 Sans-serif or Gothic typefaces, an unadorned font style, that lacks "serifs" at the ends of strokes
 East Asian Gothic typeface, the "sans-serif" equivalent for East Asian writing systems
 Block letters or Gothic writing, a style of writing alphabetic scripts and abjads in which characters are individual glyphs without joining

Transport
SS Gothic (1893), a White Star Line ship
SS Gothic (1947), a Corinthic-class passenger and cargo liner

Other
Gothic (moth), a species of nocturnal moth
Gothic Line, a World War II defensive line
Gothics, one of the Adirondack High Peaks in New York
Gothic F.C., a football club in Norwich, England
New Gothic, a contemporary art movement
Batman: Gothic, a 1990 comic book story arc
Gothic plate armour, a style of armour used in the 15th century

See also
Geats
Goth (disambiguation)
Gothic War (disambiguation)
Gothika, a 2003 American supernatural psychological horror thriller film

Language and nationality disambiguation pages